XHKY-FM is a radio station on 97.1 FM in Huixtla, Chiapas, Mexico. The station is operated by Grupo Radio Comunicación and is known as Romántica.

History

XHKY began as XEKY-AM 1280, with a concession awarded on October 2, 1968. It was owned by Jorge López Montes de Oca and later by La Voz de la Costa de Chiapas, S.A. It migrated to FM as XHKY-FM in the early 2010s.

As part of wholesale format and operator changes within the stations now operated by Grupo Radio Comunicación in August 2019, XHKY became a romantic station using the Romántica name.

References

Radio stations in Chiapas
Radio stations established in 1968
1968 establishments in Mexico